The 2005 Football League Trophy Final was the 22nd final of the domestic football cup competition for teams from Football Leagues One, Two and The Conference, the Football League Trophy. The final was played at Millennium Stadium in Cardiff on 10 April 2005. The match was contested between Southend United and Wrexham. Wrexham won the match 2–0 with goals from Juan Ugarte and Darren Ferguson.

Match details

References

External links
Official website
Match details
 

2005
Southend United F.C. matches
Wrexham A.F.C. matches
Trophy
Tro
Football League Trophy Final